Somethin' Special is an album by organist Richard "Groove" Holmes with composer, arranger and pianist Les McCann recorded in 1962 and released on the Pacific Jazz label.

Reception

The AllMusic review by Leo Stanley states: "It's a fine, infectious album, highlighted by Holmes and McCann's stylish solo".

Track listing 
All compositions by Les McCann except where noted.
 "Somethin' Special" – 9:10
 "Black Groove" – 5:43
 "Me & Groove" – 3:09
 "Comin' Through the Apple" – 5:15
 "I Thought I Knew You" – 6:27
 "Carma" – 5:24

Personnel 
Richard "Groove" Holmes – organ
Les McCann – piano
Joe Splink – alto saxophone, tenor saxophone
Joe Pass – guitar
Ron Jefferson – drums

References 

Les McCann albums
Richard Holmes (organist) albums
1962 albums
Pacific Jazz Records albums